Burning the Witches is the debut studio album by German heavy metal band, Warlock, released in 1984 through the Belgian independent label Mausoleum Records. The album was re-released in late 1984 by Vertigo Records, which went on to release all future Warlock albums.

Track listing

Personnel

Warlock 
 Doro Pesch – vocals
 Peter Szigeti – guitar
 Rudy Graf – guitar
 Frank Rittel – bass
 Michael Eurich – drums

Production 
 Axel Thubeauville – producer
 Ralf Hubert – engineer
Peter Zimmerman – executive producer, management
 Rainer Assmann and Henry Staroste – remixing (uncredited)
Nico Chiriatti – album concept

References 

1984 debut albums
Warlock (band) albums
Mausoleum Records albums
Vertigo Records albums